Laung Laachi ( Clove & Cardamom) is a 2018 Indian Punjabi-language romantic drama film written and directed by Amberdeep Singh. Produced by Villagers Film Studio, it stars Neeru Bajwa, Singh and Ammy Virk. The film chronicles the story of a married couple who decided to live as strangers under one roof, following the wife's desire to fall in love before marriage. Laung Laachi has Amrit Maan, Nirmal Rishi, Baninder Bunny, and Gurpreet Bhangu in supporting roles.

Gurmeet Singh composed the film's soundtrack, which features vocals from Virk, Mannat Noor, Prabh Gill, Maan, and Gurshabad. The "title track song" and "Rooh De Rukh" from the film's soundtrack became popular. The title track of the film became the first Indian music video to surpass one billion views on YouTube. The film was released theatrically on 9 March 2018 in India.

Plot
Laachi (Neeru Bajwa) marries Mehnga (Amberdeep Singh). She loves to sing and dance. She tells Mehnga she wanted to fall in love and marry, but instead married as per her family's wishes. She asks him to pretend they are strangers so she can fulfill her fantasy now. Mehnga agrees even though he is clueless as to how to woo a girl. They play this game and happily live their life.

Laachi gets a chance to sing a song and make some money. Due to financial difficulties, she ends up singing and dancing with family's approval. Meanwhile, a famous singer, Ajitpal Singh, sees Laachi and signs her up with him. His management company has Laachi and Mehnga sign a document affirming they are single so the Laachi-Ajitpal duo can become more famous. Laachi is star-struck by Ajitpal and agrees with whatever he suggests. Ajitpal is infatuated with Laachi and tries to separate the husband and wife. Mehnga leaves Laachi and returns to his village due to some misunderstandings. Laachi follows him and resolves the misunderstandings.

Cast
 Neeru Bajwa as Laachi 
 Amberdeep Singh as Mehnga
 Ammy Virk as Ajitpal Singh
 Gurpreet Bhangu as Bebe Tej Kaur
 Baninder Bunny as neighbor 
 Nirmal Rishi as Ajitpal's daadi
 Amrit Maan as Singer Jagtaar Maan 
 Gurinder Makna as Mehnga's uncle 
 Prince Kanwaljit Singh 
 Veet Baljit as Geetkar Kaonkeaan Wala 
 Labh Chatamliwala as Gaama Singh

Soundtrack

Soundtrack album of the film consists of 8 tracks sung by singers like Mannat Noor, Ammy Virk and Prabh Gill. The album was released by T-Series on 8 March 2018.

Sequel
A sequel of the film titled as Laung Laachi 2 with same cast of Neeru Bajwa, Singh and Ammy Virk and directed by Amberdeep Singh  released on 19 August 2022.

References

External links
 
 BookMyShow

2018 films
Punjabi-language Indian films
2010s Punjabi-language films
Indian comedy-drama films